Say Nothing is a 2001 drama, romance, and thriller film written by Madeline Sunshine and directed by Allan Moyle. The film stars William Baldwin, Nastassja Kinski, and Hart Bochner.

Cast
William Baldwin as Julian
Nastassja Kinski as Grace
Hart Bochner as Matt
Jordy Benattar as Casey
Michelle Duquet as Christine
Geoffrey Bowes as Jack
Susie Dias as Lupe
Andy Velasquez as Carlos
Brooke Johnson as Margo Loring
Jaymz Bee as Concierge
Giuseppe Mercurio as Restaurant Host
Samantha Espie as Linda
Matt Gordon as Tony
Sean MacMahon as Dooley Griffin
Nicole Sherman as Rita

References

External links 

 

2001 films
American romantic drama films
2000s thriller drama films
American thriller films
Films directed by Allan Moyle
2001 drama films
2000s English-language films
2000s American films